Valeriy Belousov (born January 22, 1970, in Volgograd) is a retired male decathlete from Russia. He set his personal best (7235 points) in the decathlon on August 7, 1995, during the 1995 World Championships in Sweden.

International competitions

References

1970 births
Living people
Sportspeople from Volgograd
Russian decathletes
World Athletics Championships athletes for Russia
Russian Athletics Championships winners
Russian people of Ukrainian descent